53 Aquarii (abbreviated 53 Aqr) is a binary star system in the equatorial constellation of Aquarius. 53 Aquarii is its Flamsteed designation though the star also bears the Bayer designation of f Aquarii. The combined apparent visual magnitude of the pair is a 5.56, making it just visible to the naked eye in dark suburban skies.

This is a wide binary star system with a projected separation of 100 astronomical units; indicating that the two stars are at least this distance apart. The primary component is a solar-type main sequence star with a stellar classification of G1 V. It has about 99% of the Sun's mass, 111% of the Sun's radius, and shines with 139% of the luminosity of the Sun. This energy is being emitted from an outer envelope at an effective temperature of 5,922 K, giving it the golden hue of a G-type star. An examination of the primary component with the Spitzer Space Telescope failed to detect any infrared excess that might otherwise be an indication of a circumstellar debris disk.

The companion is a slightly cooler star with an effective temperature of 5,811 K. It has a stellar classification of G5 V Fe–0.8 CH–1, indicating it is a chemically peculiar G-type main sequence star showing an under-abundance of iron and the molecule CH in its spectrum. As of 2008, it has an angular separation of 1.325 arcseconds along a position angle of 30.9° from the primary.

This system is coeval with the Castor Moving Group of stars that share a common motion through space; hence it is a candidate member of that association. This suggests that the system is young; its estimated age is in the range of 180 to 370 million years, based upon the spectrum and X-ray luminosity, respectively.

References

Aquarius (constellation)
Aquarii, f
Aquarii, 053
G-type main-sequence stars
110778
212697
8544
BD-17 6520
0859
Binary stars